Spinulata acutipennis is a moth in the family Cossidae. It is found in Guatemala.

The wingspan is about 37 mm. The forewings are crossed by short and indistinct pale brown lines. There is a large fuscous brown spot in the cell and a small vertical streak below the cell before the middle, as well as a short horizontal dark brown streak above the inner margin antemedially. The costal margin is medially shaded with grey, beyond it shaded with brown. The hindwings are white.

References

Natural History Museum Lepidoptera generic names catalog

Cossulinae
Moths described in 1905